NOS may refer to:

Science and technology 
 Nitrous oxide, also known as nos or laughing gas
 Nitric oxide synthase, a class of enzymes
 Nitrous oxide system, an internal combustion engine
 Not Otherwise Specified, a categorization of illnesses
 Network operating system, a type of software
 NOS (software), a CDC network operating system
 KA9Q NOS, a TCP/IP implementation
 NOS stereo technique, for audio recording

Businesses and organizations 
 National Ocean Service, US
 National Office of Statistics, Algeria
 National Orthodox School, Amman, Jordan
 Nederlandse Omroep Stichting, a Dutch broadcaster
 New Orleans Saints, an American football team
 Nitrous Oxide Systems, a subdivision of Holley Performance Products, an American automotive company
 NOS (broadcaster)
 NOS (Portuguese company)

Music
Nos, an opera by Shostakovich
N.O.S, part of the French rap duo PNL

Other uses 
 National Occupational Standards, UK
 National Orange Show, San Bernardino, California, US
 New old stock, unused old merchandise
 NOS (drink), named after Nitrous Oxide Systems
 Nos, Book of the Resurrection, a book by Miguel Serrano
 Nos. or nos., the numero sign, an abbreviation of "numbers"
 Fascene Airport, Nosy Be, Madagascar (IATA code)

See also 

 Nós
 Noss (disambiguation)